Gonni may refer to:
 Gonnoi, a town in modern Greece
 Gonnus, a town of ancient Thessaly, Greece